Sir Robert Alfred McCall,  (9 July 1849 – April 1934) was an Irish lawyer.

He was born at Lisburn, County Antrim, and educated at the Queen's College Galway and Queen's College Belfast.

Legal career
Called to the Bar by the Middle Temple in 1871. In 1891, having already acquired a large junior practice, he took silk (that is, was appointed Queen's Counsel). He served in numerous cases involving the common law and, while not making the first rank of Winch and Candy, was a powerful and popular advocate.

Politically, McCall was allied to the Unionist cause and was friendly with Lord James of Hereford. This friendship led to McCall's appointment as Attorney General and Queen's Serjeant to the Duchy of Lancaster.

He was elected as a Bencher of the Middle Temple in 1918.  He was made a Commissioner of the Assize and K.C.V.O. (Knight Commander of the Royal Victorian Order) in 1921 and was also appointed as Registrar of the Railway and Canal Commission in the same year. He was senator of the University of London and President of the Huguenot Society of London in 1923.

He was a correspondent with The Times.  There are three portraits of him in the National Portrait Gallery.

He married Alice MacSwinney of Galway in 1876 (McCall had attended university with her brother R. F. MacSwinney).

Sources
Obituary, The Times, 7 April 1934; pg. 12; Issue 46722; col C

External links
 

1849 births
1934 deaths
Alumni of the University of Galway
British King's Counsel
Knights Commander of the Royal Victorian Order
People from Lisburn
19th-century King's Counsel
20th-century King's Counsel
The Times people